The grey-cheeked bulbul (Alophoixus tephrogenys) is a species of songbird in the bulbul family, Pycnonotidae.  It is found from the Malay Peninsula to the Greater Sunda Islands. Its natural habitats are subtropical or tropical moist lowland forests and subtropical or tropical moist montane forests.

Subspecies 
Two subspecies are recognized.
 A. t. tephrogenys - (Jardine & Selby, 1833): Originally described as a separate species in the genus Trichophorus (a synonym for Criniger). Found on the Malay Peninsula and eastern Sumatra
 A. t. gutturalis - (Bonaparte, 1850): Originally described as a separate species in the genus Trichophorus. Found on Borneo

References

grey-cheeked bulbul
grey-cheeked bulbul